Barani-ye Ajam (also Romanized as Bārānī-ye ‘Ajam) is a village in Hasanlu Rural District, Mohammadyar District, Naqadeh County, West Azerbaijan Province, Iran. At the 2006 census, its population was 331, in 67 families.

References 

Populated places in Naqadeh County